Zamru Manglu Kahandole was an Indian politician. He was elected from the Malegaon in Maharashtra to the lower House of the Indian Parliament the Lok Sabha as a member of the Indian National Congress.

References

1930 births
Lok Sabha members from Maharashtra
India MPs 1967–1970
India MPs 1971–1977
India MPs 1980–1984
India MPs 1991–1996
India MPs 1998–1999
Indian National Congress politicians
Living people
Indian National Congress politicians from Maharashtra